The Windsor Express is a Canadian professional basketball team based in Windsor, Ontario, Canada. The Express are an expansion team of the National Basketball League of Canada that began play in the 2012–13 season. The Express play its home games at the WFCU Centre.

History
On June 28, 2012, the NBL announced that Windsor had been awarded an expansion team for the 2012–13 season.  As the eighth franchise, the league created divisions and placed the Express in the Central Division. On August 1, 2012 the team nickname was officially confirmed.  The Express name is partially a tribute to the Underground Railroad and to the rail yards on the banks of the Detroit River.

The team compiled a 22–18 record in its inaugural year, placing second in the Central Division and being seeded 3rd in the playoffs.  It lost its only post-season series, a semifinal against the Summerside Storm, three-games-to-two.

On April 17, 2014, the Express won their first championship against the Island Storm (formerly Summerside Storm), 121–106.

The Express were named the 2015 NBL of Canada Champions on April 30, 2015 when the Halifax Rainmen forfeited game 7 after events that transpired earlier in the day. Halifax opted to forfeit the game and leave Windsor, where the game was set to take place, due to an on-court altercation between the two teams earlier in the day.

Home arenas
Originally opened in 2008, the WFCU Centre is a sports-entertainment arena in Windsor, Ontario, Canada. The arena has a capacity of 7,000 when setup for basketball. The Express share the arena with the Windsor Spitfires of the Ontario Hockey League. In 2019 The Express proposed a bid to renovate the Windsor Arena to become the new home of the Windsor Express and local recreational activities. In 2021, the proposal was denied by the City.

Current roster

Season-by-season record

References

External links
 

 
National Basketball League of Canada teams
Sport in Windsor, Ontario
Basketball teams in Ontario
Basketball teams established in 2012
2012 establishments in Ontario